The Little River is a river passing through the northern part of Miami, Florida, United States. It empties into Biscayne Bay.

History
The neighborhood of Little River was annexed by the city of Miami in 1925.

See also
List of rivers of Florida
List of rivers of the Americas by coastline

References

Rivers of Florida
Bodies of water of Miami-Dade County, Florida
Geography of Miami